A continuity equation or transport equation is an equation that describes the transport of some quantity. It is particularly simple and powerful when applied to a conserved quantity, but it can be generalized to apply to any extensive quantity. Since mass, energy, momentum, electric charge and other natural quantities are conserved under their respective appropriate conditions, a variety of physical phenomena may be described using continuity equations.

Continuity equations are a stronger, local form of conservation laws. For example, a weak version of the law of conservation of energy states that energy can neither be created nor destroyed—i.e., the total amount of energy in the universe is fixed. This statement does not rule out the possibility that a quantity of energy could disappear from one point while simultaneously appearing at another point. A stronger statement is that energy is locally conserved: energy can neither be created nor destroyed, nor can it "teleport" from one place to another—it can only move by a continuous flow. A continuity equation is the mathematical way to express this kind of statement. For example, the continuity equation for electric charge states that the amount of electric charge in any volume of space can only change by the amount of electric current flowing into or out of that volume through its boundaries.

Continuity equations more generally can include "source" and "sink" terms, which allow them to describe quantities that are often but not always conserved, such as the density of a molecular species which can be created or destroyed by chemical reactions. In an everyday example, there is a continuity equation for the number of people alive; it has a "source term" to account for people being born, and a "sink term" to account for people dying.

Any continuity equation can be expressed in an "integral form" (in terms of a flux integral), which applies to any finite region, or in a "differential form" (in terms of the divergence operator) which applies at a point.

Continuity equations underlie more specific transport equations such as the convection–diffusion equation, Boltzmann transport equation, and Navier–Stokes equations.

Flows governed by continuity equations can be visualized using a Sankey diagram.

General equation

Definition of flux

A continuity equation is useful when a flux can be defined. To define flux, first there must be a quantity  which can flow or move, such as mass, energy, electric charge, momentum, number of molecules, etc.

The way that this quantity  is flowing is described by its flux. Here are some examples and properties of flux:
 The dimension of flux is "amount of  flowing per unit time, through a unit area". Outside the pipe, where there is no water, the flux is zero.
 If there is a velocity field  which describes the relevant flow—in other words, if all of the quantity  at a point  is moving with velocity —then the flux is by definition equal to the density times the velocity field:
 
 In a well-known example, the flux of electric charge is the electric current density.

(Note that the concept that is here called "flux" is alternatively termed "flux density" in some literature, in which context "flux" denotes the surface integral of flux density. See the main article on Flux for details.)

Integral form

The integral form of the continuity equation states that:

Mathematically, the integral form of the continuity equation expressing the rate of increase of  within a volume  is:

where
  is any imaginary closed surface, that encloses a volume ,
  denotes a surface integral over that closed surface,
  is the total amount of the quantity in the volume ,
  is time,

In a simple example,  could be a building, and  could be the number of people in the building. The surface  would consist of the walls, doors, roof, and foundation of the building. Then the continuity equation states that the number of people in the building increases when people enter the building (an inward flux through the surface), decreases when people exit the building (an outward flux through the surface), increases when someone in the building gives birth (a source), and decreases when someone in the building dies (a sink).

Differential form

By the divergence theorem, a general continuity equation can also be written in a "differential form":

where
  is divergence,
  is time,
Terms that generate  (i.e.) or remove  (i.e.) are referred to as a "sources" and "sinks" respectively.

This general equation may be used to derive any continuity equation, ranging from as simple as the volume continuity equation to as complicated as the Navier–Stokes equations. This equation also generalizes the advection equation. Other equations in physics, such as Gauss's law of the electric field and Gauss's law for gravity, have a similar mathematical form to the continuity equation, but are not usually referred to by the term "continuity equation", because  in those cases does not represent the flow of a real physical quantity.

In the case that  is a conserved quantity that cannot be created or destroyed (such as energy),  and the equations become:

Electromagnetism 

In electromagnetic theory, the continuity equation is an empirical law expressing (local) charge conservation. Mathematically it is an automatic consequence of Maxwell's equations, although charge conservation is more fundamental than Maxwell's equations. It states that the divergence of the current density  (in amperes per square metre) is equal to the negative rate of change of the charge density  (in coulombs per cubic metre),

Current is the movement of charge. The continuity equation says that if charge is moving out of a differential volume (i.e., divergence of current density is positive) then the amount of charge within that volume is going to decrease, so the rate of change of charge density is negative. Therefore, the continuity equation amounts to a conservation of charge.

If magnetic monopoles exist, there would be a continuity equation for monopole currents as well, see the monopole article for background and the duality between electric and magnetic currents.

Fluid dynamics 

In fluid dynamics, the continuity equation states that the rate at which mass enters a system is equal to the rate at which mass leaves the system plus the accumulation of mass within the system.
The differential form of the continuity equation is:

where
  is fluid density,
  is time,
  is the flow velocity vector field.

The time derivative can be understood as the accumulation (or loss) of mass in the system, while the divergence term represents the difference in flow in versus flow out. In this context, this equation is also one of the Euler equations (fluid dynamics). The Navier–Stokes equations form a vector continuity equation describing the conservation of linear momentum.

If the fluid is incompressible (volumetric strain rate is zero), the mass continuity equation simplifies to a volume continuity equation:

which means that the divergence of the velocity field is zero everywhere. Physically, this is equivalent to saying that the local volume dilation rate is zero, hence a flow of water through a converging pipe will adjust solely by increasing its velocity as water is largely incompressible.

Computer vision 

In computer vision, optical flow is the pattern of apparent motion of objects in a visual scene. Under the assumption that brightness of the moving object did not change between two image frames, one can derive the optical flow equation as:

where
  is time,
  coordinates in the image,
  is the image intensity at image coordinate  and time ,
  is the optical flow velocity vector  at image coordinate  and time

Energy and heat 

Conservation of energy says that energy cannot be created or destroyed. (See below for the nuances associated with general relativity.) Therefore, there is a continuity equation for energy flow:

where
 , local energy density (energy per unit volume),
 , energy flux (transfer of energy per unit cross-sectional area per unit time) as a vector,

An important practical example is the flow of heat. When heat flows inside a solid, the continuity equation can be combined with Fourier's law (heat flux is proportional to temperature gradient) to arrive at the heat equation. The equation of heat flow may also have source terms: Although energy cannot be created or destroyed, heat can be created from other types of energy, for example via friction or joule heating.

Probability distributions 

If there is a quantity that moves continuously according to a stochastic (random) process, like the location of a single dissolved molecule with Brownian motion, then there is a continuity equation for its probability distribution. The flux in this case is the probability per unit area per unit time that the particle passes through a surface. According to the continuity equation, the negative divergence of this flux equals the rate of change of the probability density. The continuity equation reflects the fact that the molecule is always somewhere—the integral of its probability distribution is always equal to 1—and that it moves by a continuous motion (no teleporting).

Quantum mechanics 

Quantum mechanics is another domain where there is a continuity equation related to conservation of probability. The terms in the equation require the following definitions, and are slightly less obvious than the other examples above, so they are outlined here:

 The wavefunction  for a single particle in position space (rather than momentum space), that is, a function of position  and time , .
 The probability density function is 
 The probability current (aka probability flux) is 

With these definitions the continuity equation reads:

Either form may be quoted. Intuitively, the above quantities indicate this represents the flow of probability. The chance of finding the particle at some position  and time  flows like a fluid; hence the term probability current, a vector field. The particle itself does not flow deterministically in this vector field.

Semiconductor
The total current flow in the semiconductor consists of drift current and diffusion current of both the electrons in the conduction band and holes in the valence band.

General form for electrons in one-dimension:

where:
 n is the local concentration of electrons
  is electron mobility
 E is the electric field across the depletion region
 Dn is the diffusion coefficient for electrons
 Gn is the rate of generation of electrons
 Rn is the rate of recombination of electrons

Similarly, for holes:

where:
 p is the local concentration of holes
  is hole mobility
 E is the electric field across the depletion region
 Dp is the diffusion coefficient for holes
 Gp is the rate of generation of holes
 Rp is the rate of recombination of holes

Derivation

This section presents a derivation of the equation above for electrons. A similar derivation can be found for the equation for holes.

Consider the fact that the number of electrons is conserved across a volume of semiconductor material with cross-sectional area, A, and length, dx, along the x-axis. More precisely, one can say:

Mathematically, this equality can be written:
Here J denotes current density(whose direction is against electron flow by convention) due to electron flow within the considered volume of the semiconductor. It is also called electron current density.

Total electron current density is the sum of drift current and diffusion current densities:

Therefore, we have

Applying the product rule results in the final expression:

Solution
The key to solving these equations in real devices is whenever possible to select regions in which most of the mechanisms are negligible so that the equations reduce to a much simpler form.

Relativistic version

Special relativity

The notation and tools of special relativity, especially 4-vectors and 4-gradients, offer a convenient way to write any continuity equation.

The density of a quantity  and its current  can be combined into a 4-vector called a 4-current:

where  is the speed of light. The 4-divergence of this current is:

Then the continuity equation is:

in the usual case where there are no sources or sinks, that is, for perfectly conserved quantities like energy or charge. This continuity equation is manifestly ("obviously") Lorentz invariant.

Examples of continuity equations often written in this form include electric charge conservation

where  is the electric 4-current; and energy–momentum conservation

where  is the stress–energy tensor.

General relativity
In general relativity, where spacetime is curved, the continuity equation (in differential form) for energy, charge, or other conserved quantities involves the covariant divergence instead of the ordinary divergence.

For example, the stress–energy tensor is a second-order tensor field containing energy–momentum densities, energy–momentum fluxes, and shear stresses, of a mass-energy distribution. The differential form of energy–momentum conservation in general relativity states that the covariant divergence of the stress-energy tensor is zero:

This is an important constraint on the form the Einstein field equations take in general relativity.

However, the ordinary divergence of the stress–energy tensor does not necessarily vanish:

The right-hand side strictly vanishes for a flat geometry only.

As a consequence, the integral form of the continuity equation is difficult to define and not necessarily valid for a region within which spacetime is significantly curved (e.g. around a black hole, or across the whole universe).

Particle physics

Quarks and gluons have color charge, which is always conserved like electric charge, and there is a continuity equation for such color charge currents (explicit expressions for currents are given at gluon field strength tensor).

There are many other quantities in particle physics which are often or always conserved: baryon number (proportional to the number of quarks minus the number of antiquarks), electron number, mu number, tau number, isospin, and others. Each of these has a corresponding continuity equation, possibly including source / sink terms.

Noether's theorem

One reason that conservation equations frequently occur in physics is Noether's theorem. This states that whenever the laws of physics have a continuous symmetry, there is a continuity equation for some conserved physical quantity. The three most famous examples are:

 The laws of physics are invariant with respect to time-translation—for example, the laws of physics today are the same as they were yesterday. This symmetry leads to the continuity equation for conservation of energy.
 The laws of physics are invariant with respect to space-translation—for example, the laws of physics in Brazil are the same as the laws of physics in Argentina. This symmetry leads to the continuity equation for conservation of momentum.
 The laws of physics are invariant with respect to orientation—for example, floating in outer space, there is no measurement you can do to say "which way is up"; the laws of physics are the same regardless of how you are oriented. This symmetry leads to the continuity equation for conservation of angular momentum.

See also 

 One-Way Wave Equation
 Conservation law
 Conservation form
 Dissipative system

References

Further reading

Hydrodynamics, H. Lamb, Cambridge University Press, (2006 digitalization of 1932 6th edition) 
Introduction to Electrodynamics (3rd Edition), D.J. Griffiths, Pearson Education Inc, 1999, 
Electromagnetism (2nd edition), I.S. Grant, W.R. Phillips, Manchester Physics Series, 2008 
Gravitation, J.A. Wheeler, C. Misner, K.S. Thorne, W.H. Freeman & Co, 1973, 

Equations of fluid dynamics
Conservation equations
Partial differential equations